is an opera by Antonio Salieri in two acts, set to an Italian libretto by Lorenzo Da Ponte.

The work, a dramma giocoso, is set in Scotland, and was written for Adriana Ferrarese del Bene, the first Fiordiligi in Mozart's Così fan tutte.

Performance history

The opera was first performed in Vienna on 9 December 1789. This was followed by a production in Dresden on 13 October 1790. It went on to receive several productions both in Germany and Austria between 1789 and 1805.

La cifra received a recent performance in Cologne in June 2006, in  a production conducted by Martin Haselböck and directed by Christian Stückl.
In August 2018, Dell’Arte Opera Ensemble performed La Cifra at La Mama as part of that summer's Mozart and Salieri Festival. It was the opera's North American premiere, conducted by Catherine O'Shaughnessy and directed by Bea Goodwin

Roles

Synopsis

Fideling, a Scottish lord, is seeking a lost noblewoman with whom he had fallen in love. Lisotta, the daughter of the town's mayor is betrothed to Sandrino, but is in love with Fideling and believes herself to be the woman he is searching for. Eurilla also loves Fideling but despairs because she is a mere shepherdess. In Act II, before her true identity is revealed, she sings 'Alfin son sola ... Sola e mesta'  (In the end I am alone... Alone and sad). It finally emerges that Eurilla is in fact the daughter of a nobleman. She and Fideling are reunited and all ends happily in the finale.

Recordings

There is no known studio recording of the complete opera, However, The Salieri Album, (Cecilia Bartoli with the Orchestra of the Age of Enlightenment, conducted by Ádám Fischer, Decca 475 100–2) has two excerpts:
'E voi da buon marito ... Non vo’ gia che vi suonino' (Lisotta's recitative and aria from Act I) 
'Alfin son sola ... Sola e mesta fra tormenti' (Eurilla's recitative and rondo from Act II.

References

Drammi giocosi
Operas by Antonio Salieri
Operas
1789 operas
Opera world premieres at the Burgtheater